Asal is a given name ultimately derived from the Arabic ‘asal (عَسَل), meaning honey, in use in countries such as Iran and Uzbekistan.

It may refer to:

Asal Badiee (1977-2013), Iranian actress
Asal Pourheidari (born 1991), Iranian women’s basketball player and golfer
Asal Saparbaeva (born 1994), Uzbek former artistic gymnast and Olympian
Asal Shodiyeva (born 1992), Uzbek film actress and singer

Notes